Party of Separated and Divorced (in Spanish: Partido de Separados y Divorciados), is a political party in Spain.

External links
Official Party website
Articles on the party(In Spanish)
Political parties in Spain
Political parties with year of establishment missing